The Sulawesi hawk-eagle (Nisaetus lanceolatus) (earlier placed under Spizaetus), also known as Celebes hawk-eagle, is a medium-sized, approximately  long, crestless brown raptor in the family Accipitridae. The adults have rufous-brown, boldly marked head and chest feathers, dark brown wings and black-barred white below. The young has white head and underparts.

An Indonesian endemic, the Sulawesi hawk-eagle is distributed in rainforests of Sulawesi and its satellite islands of Buton, Muna, Banggai and Sula Islands. The diet consists mainly of birds, lizards, snakes and mammals.

Widespread throughout its habitat range, the Sulawesi hawk-eagle is evaluated as Least Concern on the IUCN Red List of Threatened Species. It is listed on Appendix II of CITES.

References

External links

BirdLife Species Factsheet

Sulawesi hawk-eagle
Endemic birds of Sulawesi
Sulawesi hawk-eagle